Agathotoma prominens is a species of sea snail, a marine gastropod mollusc in the family Mangeliidae.

Distribution
This species occurs in the Caribbean Sea off Cuba.

References

 Rolán E., Fernández-Garcés E. & Redfern C. (2012) New records and description of four new species of the genus Agathotoma (Gastropoda, Mangeliidae) in the Caribbean. Novapex 13(2): 45-62

External links
 

prominens
Gastropods described in 2012